Mansfield Hartley (born 7 January 1955) is a South African cricketer. He played in one List A and six first-class matches for Border in 1981/82 and 1983/84.

See also
 List of Border representative cricketers

References

External links
 

1955 births
Living people
South African cricketers
Border cricketers